Sergei Javorsky (9 June 1902 – 8 June 1993) was an Estonian footballer. He played in two matches for the Estonia national football team in 1922. He also competed in the 1924 Summer Olympics.

References

External links
 

1902 births
1993 deaths
Estonian footballers
Estonia international footballers
Footballers from Tallinn
People from the Governorate of Estonia
Association football defenders
Olympic footballers of Estonia
Footballers at the 1924 Summer Olympics